Holcobius is a genus of beetles in the family Ptinidae.

Species
These 14 species belong to the genus Holcobius:

 Holcobius affinis Perkins, 1910 i c g
 Holcobius diversus Perkins, 1910 i c g
 Holcobius frater Perkins, 1910 i c g
 Holcobius glabricollis Sharp, 1881 i c g
 Holcobius granulatus Sharp, 1881 i c g
 Holcobius haleakalae Perkins, 1910 i c g
 Holcobius hawaiiensis Perkins, 1910 i c g
 Holcobius insignis Perkins, 1910 i c g
 Holcobius minor Sharp, 1881 i c g
 Holcobius mysticus Perkins, 1910 i c g
 Holcobius pikoensis Ford, 1955 i c g
 Holcobius simplex Perkins, 1935 i c g
 Holcobius simulans Perkins, 1910 i c g
 Holcobius major Perkins, 1910 i c g

Data sources: i = ITIS, c = Catalogue of Life, g = GBIF, b = Bugguide.net

References

 
Ptinidae